Cambodia has competed in ten Summer Olympic Games. They have never won an Olympic medal and have not appeared in the Winter Olympic Games.

Cambodia first competed in the 1956 Summer Olympics which were held in Melbourne, Australia, but physically competed only in Stockholm, Sweden, as Cambodia only participated in the equestrian events which took place in Sweden due to quarantine regulations and boycotted events in Melbourne over opposition to the Suez Crisis.

Cambodia did not compete in the Olympics for a 24-year period following the 1972 Summer Olympics due to the activities of the Khmer Rouge regime, finally returning for the 1996 Summer Olympics. They have competed in every Summer Olympic Games since.

Medal tables

Medals by Summer Games

See also
 List of flag bearers for Cambodia at the Olympics
 Cambodia at the Paralympics
 Sport in Cambodia

References

External links
 
 
 
 Cambodia NOK Home page

 
Olympics